The Perleberg Solar Park is a photovoltaic power station, with an installed capacity of 35 megawatts (MW). It uses 144,144 solar panels manufactured by Chinese company Yingli. The panels are mounted at a fixed angle on posts that are driven into the ground, at a former military airport.

See also 

Photovoltaic power station
PV system
List of photovoltaic power stations
Solar power in Germany
Electricity sector in Germany

References 

Photovoltaic power stations in Germany